Jeremiah Brown may refer to:

 Jeremiah Brown (politician) (1785–1858), American politician from Pennsylvania
 Jeremiah Brown (rower) (born 1985), Canadian rower
 Jeremiah Z. Brown (1839–1916), American Union soldier
 Jeremiah A. Brown (1841–1913), politician and civil rights activist in Cleveland, Ohio

See also
 Jerry Brown (disambiguation)
 Jeremiah Brown House and Mill Site